Long Lasting Days is a 1973 Italian crime drama film written and directed  by Ferdinando Baldi and starring Mino Reitano, Philippe Leroy and Ewa Aulin.

Plot
A man falls in love with a beautiful young woman and puts his life in danger to raise the money to finance her hospital treatment.

Cast

Mino Reitano as Andrea Rispoli
Ewa Aulin as Anna Andersson
Philippe Leroy as  Philippe
Eva Czemerys as  Frieda
Luciano Catenacci as Spyros
Franco Ressel as The Doctor
Franco Fantasia as Manolo
Dante Maggio as  "Uncle" Giovanni 
Nello Pazzafini as Nello

References

External links

Italian crime drama films
1973 crime drama films
1973 films
Films directed by Ferdinando Baldi
1970s Italian films